Moldau is a German word which may refer to:
The historical region of Moldavia
Vltava, a river in the Czech Republic
Moldova River, a river in Romania
"The Moldau", German name of a symphonic poem by Bedřich Smetana named after the Vltava
Moldova, a European country that was previously part of the Soviet Union

See also
 Moldavia (disambiguation)
 Moldava (disambiguation)